The 2002–03 Slovak 1.Liga season was the 10th season of the Slovak 1. Liga, the second level of ice hockey in Slovakia. 12 teams participated in the league, and MHC Nitra won the championship.

Standings

External links
 Season on hockeyarchives.info

Slovak 1. Liga
Slovak 1. Liga seasons
Liga